Jerusalem of the East as a nickname may refer to the following places:

Pyongyang, North Korea
Wenzhou, China

See also 

 Pyongyang Revival (1907)